Sokcho Stadium is a multi-purpose stadium in Sokcho, South Korea. It is used mostly for football matches. The stadium has a capacity for 25,000 spectators and was opened in 1994. 

Between 2015 and 2017, the stadium was used by K League club Gangwon FC.

References

External links
 City of Sokcho official website
 

Sports venues in Gangwon Province, South Korea
Football venues in South Korea
Gangwon FC
Multi-purpose stadiums in South Korea
Sports venues completed in 1994
1994 establishments in South Korea
20th-century architecture in South Korea